Hans "Jean" Löring (16 August 1934 – 6 March 2005) was a German football player and entrepreneur best known for his role as chairman of SC Fortuna Köln, a role he filled for over 30 years, from 1967 to 2001.

Biography
Born as Hans Löring, he himself took the name Jean which, in the local Cologne dialect, is pronounced Schäng. Löring, by trade, was an electrician and after his active career started an electrical business. He also dealt in real estate.

As a football player, Löring fielded for Preußen Dellbrück, later to become Viktoria Köln (1955–61), and Alemannia Aachen (1961–62), in the Oberliga West.

In 1967, he took over as chairman of Fortuna Köln. Throughout his time in this position, he is estimated to have supported the club with between DM 30 and 40 million, eventually leading to his own insolvency. After having to declare insolvency, Löring was rarely seen in public, as he felt embarrassed about it. His club, Fortuna Köln, was only able to survive in professional football through his financial help, rarely enjoying good support in Cologne and consequently, after his departure, the club itself became insolvent. Fortuna declined as far as the sixth division Verbandsliga but has since made a partial recovery.

In the time as chairman of the club, Fortuna's greatest success was reaching the Bundesliga in 1973, where it lasted for only one season, and making a losing appearance in the German Cup final in 1983, against local rival 1. FC Köln.

Löring spend his final years mostly alone, accompanied only by his four dogs.

Character
Jean Löring was one of the most colorful figures in German football.

In December 1999, when his club was 0–2 behind against Waldhof Mannheim he sacked coach Toni Schumacher, the former national team goalkeeper, at half time. Because the assistant coach left with Schumacher he himself coached the team for the rest of the game and promptly lost 1–5. Throughout his time with Fortuna he took up the double role, serving as chairman and coach, on five occasions.

When Löring was banned from the stadium for a game because he verbally attacked a referee he decided to dress up as Santa Claus and watch the game from the stands without being identified.

Hans Krankl, who was briefly coach at Fortuna, when joining the club was told how difficult Löring was but found him to be one of the nicest people he ever met in football and described him as a grandfatherly figure.

Death
Löring, suffering from cancer, died at the Hospiz Dr.-Mildred-Scheel-Haus in Cologne on 6 March 2005. He was buried at the Südfriedhof, located in Köln-Zollstock.

After Löring's death it was discussed to rename the home of Fortuna, the Südstadion, after him. The city also marked out the way to his grave at Südfriedhof.

References

External links
 SC Fortuna Köln website
 

1934 births
2005 deaths
Footballers from Cologne
German footballers
German football managers
Alemannia Aachen players
FC Viktoria Köln players
Bundesliga managers
SC Fortuna Köln managers
Association football defenders